Carpenter v. United States, 138 S.Ct. 2206 (2018), is a landmark United States Supreme Court case concerning the privacy of historical cell site location information (CSLI). The Court held that the government violates the Fourth Amendment to the United States Constitution when it accesses historical CSLI records containing the physical locations of cellphones without a search warrant.

Prior to Carpenter, government entities could obtain cellphone location records by claiming the information was required as part of an investigation. After Carpenter, government entities are required to obtain a search warrant to access that information. Recognizing the influence of new consumer communications devices in the 2010s, the Court expanded its conceptions of constitutional rights toward the privacy of this type of data. However, the Court emphasized that the Carpenter ruling was narrowly restricted to the precise types of information and search procedures that were relevant to Carpenter's complaint.

Background

Cell site location information (CSLI)
Cellular telephone service providers are able to find the location of cell phones through either global positioning system (GPS) data or cell site location information (CSLI), in the process of connecting calls and data transmissions. CSLI is captured by nearby cell towers, and this information is used to triangulate the location of phones. Service providers capture and store this data for business purposes, such as troubleshooting, maximizing network efficiencies, and determining whether to charge customers roaming fees for particular calls. 

The data can also illustrate the historical movements of a cellphone. Thus, anyone with access to this data has the ability to know where the phone has been and what other cell phones were in the same area at a given time. When users travel with their cellphones, this data can theoretically illustrate every place a person has traveled, and possibly other people encountered via their corresponding data.

The third-party doctrine 
Prior to Carpenter, the Supreme Court consistently held that a person had no reasonable expectation of privacy in regard to information voluntarily turned over to third parties such as telephone companies, and therefore a search warrant is not required when government officials seek this information. This legal theory is known as the third-party doctrine, established by the Supreme Court in Smith v. Maryland (1979), in which the Court determined that government can obtain a list of phone numbers dialed from a suspect's phone.

By the 2010s, cellphones and particularly smartphones had become important tools for nearly every person in the United States. Many applications, such as GPS navigation and location tools, require a cellphone to send and receive information constantly, including the exact location of the phone. As technology advanced in the 2010s, the Supreme Court began to modify its precedents on government searches of personal communications devices, given new consumer behaviors that may transcend the third-party doctrine.

Facts of the case 
Between December 2010 and March 2011, several individuals in the Detroit, Michigan area conspired and participated in armed robberies at RadioShack and T-Mobile stores across the region. In April 2011, four of the robbers were captured and arrested. The petitioner, Timothy Carpenter, was not among the initial group of arrestees. One of those arrested confessed and turned over his phone so that FBI agents could review the calls made from his phone around the time of the robberies. The agents obtained a search warrant to inspect the information in the phone, in order to find additional contacts of the arrestee and compile more evidence about the crime ring. 

From the historical cell-site records, the agents confirmed that Timothy Carpenter was also part of the crime ring, and proceeded to compile information about the location of his phone over 127 days. In turn, this information revealed that Carpenter had been within a two-mile radius of four robberies at the times they were perpetrated. This evidence was used to support Carpenter's arrest. At criminal court, Carpenter was found guilty of several counts of aiding and abetting robberies that affected interstate commerce and another count of using a firearm during a violent crime. He was sentenced to 116 years in prison.

Appeal at the Sixth Circuit 
Carpenter appealed his conviction and sentence to the United States Court of Appeals for the Sixth Circuit, arguing that the CSLI evidence used against him should be suppressed because the police had not obtained a warrant before searching through it. In 2015, the Circuit Court upheld Carpenter's conviction. This ruling was largely based on the Smith v. Maryland precedent, stating that Carpenter used cellular telephone networks voluntarily, and per the third-party doctrine he had no realistic expectation that the data should be private. Thus, review of that information by the police did not constitute a "search" and did not require a warrant under the Fourth Amendment.

Carpenter appealed this ruling to the U.S. Supreme Court, which granted certiorari in 2016.

Opinion of the court

Twenty amicus curiae briefs were filed by interested organizations, scholars, and corporations for Carpenter's case. Some considered the case to be the most important Fourth Amendment dispute to come before the Supreme Court in a generation. The Court issued its decision in 2018, with the majority opinion written by Chief Justice John Roberts. 

The Court's ruling recognized that the Carpenter case revealed a contradiction between two Supreme Court precedents on the matter of police searches of personal communications information. In United States v. Jones (2012) the Court had ruled that GPS tracking could constitute a search under the Fourth Amendment as a violation of a person's reasonable expectation of privacy. Meanwhile, the Court had held in Smith v. Maryland (1979) that the third-party doctrine absolved the government from warrant requirements when searching through telephone records. 

Ultimately, in Carpenter the court determined that the third-party doctrine could not be extended to historical cell site location information (CSLI). Instead, the Court compared "detailed, encyclopedic, and effortlessly compiled" CSLI records to the GPS information at issue in United States v. Jones, recognizing that both forms of data accord the government the ability to track individuals' past movements. Furthermore, the Court noted that CSLI could pose even greater privacy risks than GPS data, as the prevalence of cellphones could accord the government "near perfect surveillance" of an individual's movements. Accordingly, the Court ruled that, under the Fourth Amendment, the government must obtain a search warrant in order to access historical CSLI records. Roberts argued that technology "has afforded law enforcement a powerful new tool to carry out its important responsibilities. At the same time, this tool risks Government encroachment of the sort the Framers [of the US Constitution], after consulting the lessons of history, drafted the Fourth Amendment to prevent." As stated in the opinion, "Unlike the nosy neighbor who keeps an eye on comings and goings, they [new technologies] are ever alert, and their memory is nearly infallible. There is a world of difference between the limited types of personal information addressed in Smith [...] and the exhaustive chronicle of location information casually collected by wireless carriers today."

However, Roberts stressed that the Carpenter decision was a very narrow one and did not affect other parts of the third-party doctrine, such as banking records. Similarly, he noted that the decision did not prevent the collection of CSLI without a warrant in cases of emergency or for issues of national security.

Dissenting opinions
Justice Anthony Kennedy, in a dissenting opinion, cautioned against the limitations on law enforcement inherent in the majority opinion. According to Kennedy, the ruling "places undue restrictions on the lawful and necessary enforcement powers exercised not only by the Federal Government, but also by law enforcement in every State and locality throughout the Nation. Adherence to this Court's longstanding precedents and analytic framework would have been the proper and prudent way to resolve this case." 

In another dissent, Justice Samuel Alito wrote: "I fear that today's decision will do far more harm than good. The Court's reasoning fractures two fundamental pillars of Fourth Amendment law, and in doing so, it guarantees a blizzard of litigation while threatening many legitimate and valuable investigative practices upon which law enforcement has rightfully come to rely." In yet another dissent, Justice Neil Gorsuch agreed with most of the majority opinion but stressed that CSLI data is personal property, and its storage by telephone companies should be immaterial. According to Gorsuch, the Fourth Amendment "grants you the right to invoke its guarantees whenever one of your protected things (your person, your house, your papers, or your effects) is unreasonably searched or seized. Period." Gorsuch further recommended that the third-party doctrine be overturned as inconsistent with the original meaning of the Fourth Amendment.

Impact and subsequent developments
After the Supreme Court ruling, Carpenter's criminal conviction was remanded to the Sixth Circuit to determine if it could stand without the CSLI data that required a warrant per the Supreme Court. Carpenter's lawyers argued that the data should have been subject to the exclusionary rule and thrown out as material collected without a proper warrant under the Supreme Court's ruling. However, the Circuit Court judges concluded that the FBI was acting in good faith with respect to collecting the data based on the law at the time the crimes were committed. This type of good faith exemption is permitted per another Supreme Court precedent, Davis v. United States. The evidence was allowed to stand, and the Sixth Circuit again upheld Carpenter's criminal conviction and prison sentence. 

Meanwhile, the Supreme Court's ruling in Carpenter was very narrow and did not otherwise change the third-party doctrine related to other business records that might incidentally reveal location information, nor did it overrule prior decisions concerning conventional surveillance techniques and tools such as security cameras. The Court did not extend its ruling to other matters related to cellphones not presented in Carpenter, including real-time CSLI or "tower dumps" (the downloading of information about all the devices that connected to a particular cell site during a particular interval). The opinion also did not consider other data collection goals involving foreign affairs or national security.

References

Further reading

External links
 
 Case page at SCOTUSblog

2016 in United States case law
2018 in United States case law
United States Supreme Court cases
United States Fourth Amendment case law
United States Supreme Court cases of the Roberts Court
United States Court of Appeals for the Sixth Circuit cases
Search and seizure case law
Telecommunications law
Mobile phone culture
2010s in Detroit
Global Positioning System